The 1984 Atlanta Falcons season was the franchise’s 19th season in the National Football League (NFL). The season saw Atlanta attempting to improve on its previous record of 7–9 from 1983. The Falcons would split their first six games, but then suffer a franchise-record 9-game losing streak to knock the team down to 3–12. The Falcons would win their finale against the Philadelphia Eagles and finish the season 4–12, their worst record since 1976.

Offseason

NFL Draft

NFL supplemental draft 

The National Football League held a draft for college seniors who had already signed with either the United States Football League (USFL) or the Canadian Football League (CFL) on June 5, 1984, in New York City. The draft was for players who would have been eligible for the regular 1984 NFL draft, but who had already signed a contract with either a team from the USFL or CFL prior to it.

Personnel

Staff

Roster

Regular season

Schedule

Game summaries

Week 1

Week 2: vs. Detroit Lions

Week 3 at Vikings

Week 5 (Sunday, September 30, 1984): at San Francisco 49ers 

Point spread: 49ers by 6
 Over/Under: 49.5 (under)
 Time of Game:

Week 11

Week 14 (Sunday, December 2, 1984): vs. San Francisco 49ers 

Point spread: 49ers by 13
 Over/Under: 40.0 (over)
 Time of Game:

Standings

Awards and records 
 Gerald Riggs, Franchise Record, Most Rushing Yards in One Game, 202 Yards (September 2, 1984)

References

External links 
 1984 Atlanta Falcons at Pro-Football-Reference.com

Atlanta Falcons
Atlanta Falcons seasons
Atlanta Falcons